is a Japanese pop and enka singer. He won a 1990 Japan Record Award for enka.

External links

1949 births
Living people
Enka singers
Japanese male pop singers
Musicians from Osaka
20th-century Japanese male singers
20th-century Japanese singers